Sucker Creek First Nation is a Cree First Nations band government whose reserve community is located along the southwestern shore of Lesser Slave Lake near Enilda, Alberta. It is a Treaty 8 First Nation. The band had a registered population of 2,099 (as of March 2003) and almost 6,000 hectares of reserve land.

Notable members
Chief Headman Moostoos
Harold Cardinal
Lorne Cardinal
Darren Brule
Darlene Cardinal
Nipawi Mahihkan Misit Kakinoosit
Linsay Willier
Ron Lariviere - lead social worker for the government of Alberta's Child Welfare strategy regarding Bill C 92.

References

Cree governments
First Nations governments in Alberta